...And Mother Makes Three is a British sitcom shown on ITV from 27 April 1971 to 27 June 1973. Starring Wendy Craig, it was written by Peter Buchanan, Peter Robinson, Richard Waring and Carla Lane. It was made for the ITV network by Thames Television.

Cast
Wendy Craig – Sally Harrison
Robin Davies – Simon Harrison
David Parfitt – Peter Harrison
Valerie Lush – Auntie Flo
George Selway – Mr Campbell
Richard Coleman – David Redway (series 3 and 4)
Julie Dawn Cole  – Arabella (series 1 and 2)
Miriam Mann – Jane Redway (series 3 and 4)
Richard Thorp – Stanley Marsh (Best Man) (series 4, episodes 4 and 5)

Plot
Newly widowed mother Sally Harrison is trying to hold down a job as an assistant to Mr Campbell, a veterinarian. Her children are Simon and Peter, and her aunt Flo lives with them and tries to help. In Series 3 Mr Campbell moves to Scotland and the vet premises is taken over by divorcee David Redway, an antique bookseller who has a daughter, Jane. David and Sally fall in love.

Episodes

Series One (1971)
"Simon's Holiday" (27 April 1971)
"Birthday Bike" (4 May 1971)
"A Bird in the Hand" (11 May 1971)
"Get Mobile" (18 May 1971)
"School for Love" (25 May 1971)
"Pound of Flesh" (1 June 1971)
"Mr Mum" (8 June 1971)

Series Two (1971–72)
"A Hard Day Out" (2 December 1971)
"The Matchmakers" (9 December 1971)
"Growing Pains" (16 December 1971)
"But How Can I Tell Them?" (23 December 1971)
"Once A Year Day" (30 December 1971)
"All Play and No Work" (6 January 1972)

Short Special (1971)
Part of Mike and Bernie Winters' All-Star Christmas Comedy Carnival (25 December 1971)

Series Three (1972)
"Gather Ye Mushrooms While Ye May" (14 September 1972)
"Father Figure" (21 September 1972)
"Girl Talk" (28 September 1972)
"Thank Heaven for Little Girls?" (5 October 1972)
"A Family Affair" (12 October 1972)
"Two Hearts That Beat As Two" (19 October 1972)

Series Four (1973)
"Wedding Talk" (16 May 1973)
"Homes, Sweet Homes" (23 May 1973)
"A Home and A Job" (30 May 1973)
"The Eve of the Day" (6 June 1973)
"And Father Makes Five" (13 June 1973)
"Starting Trouble" (20 June 1973)
"The Honeymoon's Over" (27 June 1973)

DVD releases
All four series have been released on DVD in the United Kingdom (Region 2) by Network DVD. A 4-disc set of the complete series has also been released.

...And Mother Makes Five
In the fourth series of ...And Mother Makes Three Sally Harrison marries David Redway, leading to a sequel called ...And Mother Makes Five.

References

Further reading
Mark Lewisohn, "Radio Times Guide to TV Comedy", BBC Worldwide, 2003

External links
...And Mother Makes Three at Nostalgia Central

Locations

The house in the opening credits is in Trowlock Avenue Teddington.  Has been remodelled, you can recognise the location.

1970s British sitcoms
1971 British television series debuts
1973 British television series endings
ITV sitcoms
Television series by Fremantle (company)
Television shows produced by Thames Television
English-language television shows
Television shows shot at Teddington Studios